Baghdad Tower (Al-Ma'mun) (previously called International Saddam Tower, is a  TV tower in Baghdad, Iraq.  The tower opened in 1994 and replaced a communications tower destroyed in the Gulf War. A revolving restaurant and observation deck are located on the top floor. After the 2003 invasion of Iraq, the tower was occupied by American soldiers and was renamed as Baghdad Tower.

Gallery

External links
 
 
 Information to the reconstruction

Towers completed in 1994
Towers with revolving restaurants
Monuments and memorials in Iraq
Towers in Iraq
Buildings and structures in Baghdad
Radio masts and towers
1994 establishments in Iraq
Observation towers